Lawrence Cain (1844–1884) was a lawyer, state representative, state senator, and public official in various offices during the Reconstruction era.

Owned as a slave by Zachariah W. Carwile during his youth, he served as a body servant of Confederate Army officer Thomas W. Carwile during the American Civil War. He was emancipated after the American Civil War.

He was elected to the South Carolina House in 1868 and the state senate in 1872. In 1876, he lost his re-election campaign to Martin Witherspoon Gary, who served as a general in the Confederate Army and became a leader among the Red Shirts, which reduced African American voter participation through intimidation and assaults.

Cain was in the first graduating class of African American lawyers from the University of South Carolina.

One of Cain's descendants wrote a biography about him: Virtue of Cain: From Slave to Senator.

References

Members of the South Carolina House of Representatives
South Carolina state senators
University of South Carolina School of Law alumni
South Carolina lawyers
1844 births
1884 deaths
19th-century American politicians
19th-century American lawyers